= Straton Falls =

- Location within New York
- Location: Delaware County, New York
- Coordinates: 42°15′45″N 74°35′59″W
- Elevation: 1,526 ft (465 m)

Straton Falls is a waterfall in Delaware County, New York. It is located southwest of Roxbury on an unnamed creek.
